Tryvannstårnet is a 118-metre (387 feet) tall broadcasting tower near Oslo, located 529 metres (1,736 feet) above mean sea level on the summit of Tryvannshøyden hill overlooking lake Tryvann.

Tryvannstårnet was built in 1962 and has an observation deck at a height of 60 metres (197 feet), from which, weather conditions permitting, the view extends to the border with Sweden and Gaustatoppen mountain. The observation deck was closed in 2005 because of new fire safety regulations which would have required expensive modifications which coincided with rapidly declining visitor numbers. In the 1980s and 1990s annual visitor numbers averaged 100,000, but in the last year it was open to the public, only 25,000.

There is a large underground shelter beneath Tryvannstårnet.

References

External links
 Web camera in the tower rotates slowly to give 360° view

Towers completed in 1962
Towers in Norway
Buildings and structures in Oslo
1962 establishments in Norway
Norkring
Transmitter sites in Norway